This is a list of viceroys of the Kingdom of Naples. Following the conquest of Naples by Louis XII of France in 1501, Naples was subject to the rule of the foreign rulers, the Kings of France, Aragon and Spain and the Habsburg Archdukes of Austria respectively. Commonly staying far from Naples, these rulers governed the Kingdom through a series of viceroys.

Sources

 Giovan Pietro Bellori: The Lives of the Modern Painters, Sculptors and Architects 

Viceroys
Viceroys of Naples
16th-century Neapolitan people
17th-century Neapolitan people
18th-century Neapolitan people